PeiJu Chien-Pott (Birth name ; born 1984) is a Taiwanese dance artist. 

Born in 1984, she was raised in Taoyuan. Chien-Pott started dancing at the age of five, and  began training aged 10. She later entered Taipei National University of the Arts' seven-year dance program developed by Lo Man-fei. Chien-Pott continued to study dance under Merce Cunningham, and later performed with Buglisi Dance Theatre and Korhan Basaran and Artists, and Nimbus Dance Works. She joined the Martha Graham Dance Company in 2011, after her second audition, and became a principal dancer in 2014 before leaving the troupe in 2016. She founded PJ Performing Arts in Taiwan. In 2017, Chien-Pott was invited to perform at the Taipei Universiade. Later that year, she received the Bessie Award for best performance in Martha Graham's Ekstasis. Chien-Pott is currently starring in the Sia, Akram Khan, Zhang Jun, Jonathan Aibel and Glenn Berger helmed kung-fu musical "Dragon Spring Phoenix Rise" at The Shed.

Personal life
She has a daughter from her first marriage. She currently resides in Jersey City, New Jersey.

References

External links

1984 births
Living people
People from Taoyuan City
Taipei National University of the Arts alumni
Bessie Award winners
Taiwanese expatriates in the United States
Taiwanese female dancers